Ylva Elisabet Eggehorn (born 6 March 1950) is a Swedish poet, writer, and hymnwriter. She is said to be among Sweden's most famous contemporary Christian writers and poets. Along with Christian poetry she wrote for what's believed to be the first Swedish worship album. In other genres she did a "historical fantasy" concerning Gustav Badin, which deals some with his imagery as a "lover" in Swedish culture.

References 

Swedish Christian hymnwriters
Swedish-language poets
Swedish women writers
Christian writers
Litteris et Artibus recipients
1950 births
Living people
Women hymnwriters